The Abdul Aleem Siddique Mosque is a mosque in Singapore that was built as a recognition of Muhammad Abdul Aleem Siddiqi’s propagation of Islam.

Profile
Muhammad Abdul Aleem Siddiqi and other Islamic activists found land on which to build a mosque. The land was conveyed on 25 February 1953 to Syed Ibrahim bin Oman Alsagoff, Ahmad bin Mohamed Ibrahim and Haji Adam Naina Mohamed Ibrahim as trustees of the All-Malaya Muslim Missionary Society (now known as JAMIYAH). The activists from the Society raised funds and built the mosque there.

The All-Malaya Muslim Missionary Society managed the Mosque during its early years. It was then managed by a committee set-up by the residents in the area. After the implementation of the Administration of Muslim Law Act (AMLA), the administration and management of the Mosque was entrusted to the Islamic Religious Council of Singapore (MUIS). The Mosque is currently being managed and administered by a group of volunteers selected by MUIS as members of the Mosque Management Board (MMB).

Transportation
The mosque is accessible from Kembangan MRT station.

See also
Barelwi
Islam in Singapore
List of mosques in Singapore
Majlis Ugama Islam Singapura

References

External links 
Abdul Aleem Siddique Mosque

Abdul Aleem Siddique